Ruffy Brook is a stream in Clearwater County, Minnesota, in the United States.

Ruffy Brook was named after Charles A. Ruffee, an Indian agent.

See also
List of rivers of Minnesota

References

Rivers of Clearwater County, Minnesota
Rivers of Minnesota